Mountain lettuce is a common name for several plants and may refer to:

Lactuca perennis, native to Europe
Podolepis robusta, native to Australia